Maccabi Hadera may refer to several Israeli sports teams:

Maccabi Hadera (basketball), a basketball team
Maccabi Hadera (volleyball), a volleyball team
Maccabi Hadera F.C., a former association football team (men)
Maccabi Kishronot Hadera F.C., an association football team (women)